One Second is a 2020 Chinese drama film directed by Zhang Yimou, about a man who escapes from a farm-prison during the Cultural Revolution. The film is based on the novel The Criminal Lu Yanshi, by author Geling Yan. Yan is not credited in the film, which has led to controversy.

Cast
 Zhang Yi as fugitive
 Liu Haocun as orphan Liu
 Fan Wei as Mr. Movie

Release
One Second was released in Chinese theatres on 27 November 2020 (with previews on 26 November 2020).

It was selected to compete for the Golden Bear at the 69th Berlin International Film Festival, but was withdrawn shortly before the screening. The official explanation for the withdrawal is "technical difficulties encountered during post-production", but critics suspected politically motivated censorship.

It would later screen as a gala presentation at the 2021 Toronto International Film Festival, with Neon acquiring the film's US distribution rights prior to the festival. After also screening at the 2021 Sydney Film Festival, the film was released in Australia by Rialto Distribution on 20 January 2022.

Reception

Awards and nominations

References

External links
 
 
 

2020 drama films
Chinese drama films
2020s Mandarin-language films
Films about the Cultural Revolution
Films about films
Films directed by Zhang Yimou
Films shot in Gansu